Wilson Combat is a custom pistol manufacturer located in Berryville, Arkansas, that specializes in customizing and manufacturing M1911A1s. First started under the name "Wilson's Gun Shop" in 1977, Bill Wilson started his new gunsmith business in the back of the family jewelry store, "Wilson's Jewelry", on the corner of Berryville's public square. In 2000, the company bought "Scattergun Technologies", and markets combat shotguns under the name "Wilson Combat Scattergun Technologies".

History
Some of the first firearms Wilson modified for customers were the Colt 1911-A1, Smith & Wesson Model 10 revolver and Ruger Single Action Revolvers. Models like the PPC .38 Special and the .44 Magnum Hunter made Wilson's reputation for producing quality firearms. Wilson originally customized pistols with aftermarket parts from gunsmiths such as Armand Swensen, and by 1983, had begun making his own parts. By 1996, Wilson was building his own M1911 pistols completely in-house.

Wilson Combat has developed custom pistols with professional competitive shooters, including IDPA co-founder Ken Hackathorn and retired US Army 1st SFOD-Delta combat veteran Larry Vickers.

They also have a partnership with Delta Force member Paul R. Howe. One of the signature Paul Howe models is the Wilson Combat Paul Howe G19.

Products
Custom M1911-A1 Handguns, in calibers such as, .45 ACP, 10mm Norma, .40 S&W, .38 Super, 9mm Luger and .22 LR.
Scattergun Technologies: 870 Shotguns in 12 gauge and 20 gauge., 11-87 Shotguns in 12 gauge only. 
Customization of Beretta Model 92/96, Sig Sauer P320, and Glock 9mm Luger series of handguns including refinishing, action tuning and various parts upgrades.
AR-15 Style Rifles in .223/.223 Wylde/5.56mm/6.8 SPC/300 AAC Blackout/.308/.338 Federal/7.62x40 WT/.204 Ruger/.458 HAM'R/.458 SOCOM and 9×19mm Parabellum
Custom Knives: Fixed Blades and Folders based on designs from custom knifemakers
Accessories for the above, including the respected model 47 M1911 magazines
Rifle and handgun ammunition

Military
Handguns from Wilson are used by special forces, including Delta Force and Navy SEALs.

References

External links

 Wilson Combat Official Web Site

Manufacturing companies based in Arkansas
Firearm manufacturers of the United States
Privately held companies based in Arkansas
Manufacturing companies established in 1977